Chaudhary Mehdi Hassan Bhatti  is a politician from Hafizabad District, Punjab, Pakistan. Chaudhry Mehdi Hassan Bhatti was born in Burj Dara, Hafizabad. An agriculturist by profession, Chaudhry Mehdi Hassan Bhatti received his education in Hafizabad and joined politics on behest of people of Hafizabad who were looking for a new face to represent them on national political platform.

Political Career

He was elected as MPA for Punjab Assembly for three consecutive terms 1985, 1988, and 1990. He was elected for his first term as MNA in 1993. Later again elected as MNA in 2002 election.

Mehdi Hassan Bhatti served as the Chairman Standing Committee of Ministry of Sports and Agriculture in the government of Prime Minister Zafarullah Khan Jamali, Shaukat Aziz and Chaudhary Shujaat Hussain. He also served as the member of Standing Committee on Communications, Standing Committee on Planning and Development and Standing Committee on Water and Power. Mehdi Hassan Bhatti is currently the important stake holder in PTI with reference to politics of complete Hafizabad and surroundings.

Among his supporters he is greatly admired for the development of Hafizabad during his tenures that includes upgrade of Hafizabad from Tehsil of Gujranwala to a District in 1993, and provision of schools, electricity, telephone (1990s), metalled roads and three M-2 interchanges, Sui Gas etc. to the remotest villages of Hafizabad; whereas, his opponents propagate his notorious aspects of his personality. Mehdi Hassan Bhatti is also known for maintaining pressure blocs within national and provincial assembly and it was vividly displayed in 2006 when he resigned from Parliament along with a number of parliamentarians.

His brother Liaqat Abbas Bhatti has been elected as member of the National Assembly 3 times, and he also served as Federal Minister for Public work department from 2010 to 2013.
His son Shoukat Ali Bhatti served as the Minister of Culture and Youth Affairs in the government of Chaudhry Pervaiz Elahi in Punjab and was the recent MNA of Hafizabad before he submitted his resignation for Imran Khan.

Personal life

Mehdi Hassan Bhatti is an avid fan of Pakistan Cricket Team.

See also 
 Shaukat Ali Bhatti

References

Living people
1955 births